Alexeyevka is a rural locality (a selo) in Aitovsky Selsoviet, Bizhbulyaksky District, Bashkortostan, Russia. The population was 187 as of 2010.

Geography 
It is located 21 km from Bizhbulyak and 182 km from Ufa.

References 

Rural localities in Bizhbulyaksky District